Clypeodytes bufo, is a species of predaceous diving beetle found in India, Bangladesh, Myanmar, Sri Lanka, China, and Vietnam.

Description
It is an alkaliphilous species inhabited in the basic waters.

References 

Dytiscidae
Insects of Sri Lanka
Insects described in 1890